The 1914 Washington football team was an American football team that represented the University of Washington during the 1914 college football season. In its seventh season under coach Gil Dobie, the team compiled a 6–0–1 record, shut out five of seven opponents, and outscored all opponents by a combined total of 242 to 13. Walter Schiel was the team captain.

Schedule

References

Washington
Washington Huskies football seasons
College football undefeated seasons
Washington football